Lingdale is a village in the unitary authority of Redcar and Cleveland and the ceremonial county of North Yorkshire, England. The village was created with the advent of ironstone mining in the area, in the early 19th century.

History 
Lingdale was built in the 1870s as a village for the ironstone mine workers and was located next to an ironstone mine. The mine was served by a railway which existed to carry iron-ore for the Lingdale mine until its closure in 1964. Few traces remain to be seen today. Although originally a village exclusively for mine workers, Lingdale slowly developed to be a village for all to come and make their home in. After the closure of the mines, in 1962, all the mine workers' houses became vacant and non-miners were able to live in them. As with the railway, little remains of the mine, most significantly the overgrown entrance to the mine. However, much of Lingdale's mining past disappeared with the demolition of the then very much run-down miners' houses. Today 1980s council houses stand on the sites of the mine workers' houses. A few mineworkers' houses still stand, now modernised.

Many of Lingdale's older Victorian houses, not associated with mine workers, still stand, as does the Lingdale United Reformed Church, a Victorian chapel-like building, and a number of other churches.

Mining disaster of 1953

On 24 August 1953, 15 men were critically injured in a horrifying gas explosion in the south-west dips district of Lingdale Ironstone Mine. During the days that followed, eight men died due to shock and the severity of their burns.

An hour and a half after the start of the morning shift there was an ignition of gas in the mine and several miners were badly burned.

Lingdale brass band

It was very common in the past, for mining communities to have a brass band, and Lingdale was no exception. A brass band was formed in 1851, as Lingdale Ironstone Miners' Band. It later became known as Lingdale Silver Band, Lingdale Silver (ICI Chemical Products) Band (from 1986). In 1998, the band merged with the Yarm & District Band to form Lockwood Band.

Notable people
Jack Curnow, a professional football goalkeeper, was born in Lingdale in 1910.

Adam Boyes, a professional footballer, was born in Lingdale in 1990.

Birthplace of Bobby Smith, former Spurs and England centre-forward, who played in their double-winning side of 1961, and scored in the FA Cup Final, on two separate occasions.

Arnold Knight, played for Spurs and also Leeds United

Bobby Smith's brother Keith, played for Chelsea and then Millwall

George Hardwick captained Middlesbrough, England, and is the only player to have captained a Great Britain side (outside of the Olympic Games).

Mary Reveley an English racehorse trainer. She trained over 2,000 winners in a 26-year career, was the first woman to saddle 100 winners in a calendar year (in 1991), and also became the first female trainer to saddle 50 winners on the flat (in 1992).

References

External links

Lingdale history

 
Villages in North Yorkshire
Places in the Tees Valley
Redcar and Cleveland
Ironstone Mines in North Yorkshire